The 2005 South Carolina Gamecocks football team represented the University of South Carolina in the Southeastern Conference during the 2005 NCAA Division I-A football season.  The Gamecocks were led by Steve Spurrier in his first season as USC head coach and played their home games in Williams-Brice Stadium in Columbia, South Carolina.

Schedule
The September 1 game versus UCF played host to ESPN's College Gameday, the second year in a row that South Carolina had hosted the program.  During the show, ESPN personality Lee Corso made disparaging remarks about the viability of the South Carolina football program which were met with derision by the Columbia crowd.  In the 2005 season, the Gamecocks defeated Tennessee and Florida, two of the three teams Corso stated they could never beat.

References

South Carolina
South Carolina Gamecocks football seasons
South Carolina Gamecocks football